Arsaces I of Armenia, also known as Arsaces I, Arshak I and Arsak (ruled 35 AD) was a Parthian Prince who was King of Armenia during 35 AD. 

Arsaces I was the first-born son of the Parthian King Artabanus II of Parthia by an unnamed wife. 

After the death of Roman Client King of Armenia, Artaxias III, in 34 AD, Artabanus II decided to put his son on the Armenian throne. Artabanus II made Arsaces I King of Armenia and Arsaces was accompanied to Armenia with a strong army. However, Roman emperor Tiberius, refused to accept Arsaces I as King of Armenia. So Tiberius, with the support of King Pharasmanes I of Iberia, appointed Pharasmanes' brother, Mithridates, to be the new Roman Client Armenian King.

Meanwhile, Arsaces I's time as Armenian king was brief. Less than a year into his reign, Arsaces I was poisoned by his servants who had been bribed to carry out the deed. After Arsaces I died, Artabanus II put another of his sons, Orodes, on the Armenian throne. However, Orodes soon had to face Mithridates in a military campaign.

References

Sources
 Tacitus, Annals of Imperial Rome, 1st century 
 R. Grousset, History of Armenia from its origins to 1071, Paris Payot, 1947 (reprinted again in 1984, 1995 & 2008) 
 M.L. Chaumont, Armenia between Rome and Iran I: the advent of Augustus to the accession of Diocletian from Aufstieg und Niedergang der Welt Römischen II, 1976 
 G. Dedeyan, History of the Armenian people, Privat Toulouse, 2007

1st-century kings of Armenia
Roman client kings of Armenia
1st-century Iranian people
Zoroastrian rulers
35 deaths